Live performance may refer to:

A play (theatre) or musical
A concert, a live performance (typically of music) before an audience
A concert performance of opera or musical theatre without theatrical staging
A concert dance, performed live for an audience.
 Live radio, radio broadcast without delay
 Live television, refers to a television production broadcast in real-time, as events happen, in the present
 Live Performance, a 1971 live album by Jake Thackray

See also
 Musical performance (disambiguation)
 Performance